Rasheed Naz (9 September 1948 – 17 January 2022) was a Pakistani film and television actor. He started his television career in 1971 in a Pashto television play and worked in several Pashto, Hindko and Urdu-language plays.

Life and career
Rasheed Naz was born on 9 September 1948 in Peshawar, NWFP (now Khyber Pakhtunkhwa), Pakistan.

In 1971, he started his television career as an actor in Pushto television play. Rasheed Naz has worked in several Pashto, Hindko and Urdu language plays. His first Urdu play was Aik Tha Gaoon (1973). His first popular play was Namoos. He also worked in Pakistan's first private television play Dasht, telecast on N T M TV channel.

In 1988, he worked in his first Pashto film Zama Jang (in Urdu "Meri Jang"). His first Urdu film was Syed Noor's Dakait. He also worked in Shoaib Mansoor's film Khuda Ke Liye (2007 film). Rasheed Naz also worked in a Shoaib Mansoor's video song "Ishq Mohabbat Apna Pan" with Iman Ali. Aside from that, Raheed Naz also starred in the Bollywood film Baby in 2015 alongside Akshay Kumar, Anupam Kher, and Madhurima Tuli.

Rasheed Naz had a long career of over forty years.

His son Hasan Noman is an actor as well and shared the screen with him in Baby, and he’s married to Madiha Rizvi.

Awards and recognition
 Pride of Performance Award by the Government of Pakistan for his services as television and film actor.

Death
Rasheed Naz died in Islamabad, Pakistan on 17 January 2022 at the age of 73. For some time, he had been suffering from some health issues. His body was brought to Peshawar for funeral and he was buried there.

Notable television plays
 Teri Rah Mein Rul Gaye
 Sabith Ali
 Namoos
 Dasht
 Dosra Asman
 Ghulam Gardish (PTV)
 Manzil
 Pinjra
 "Phir Kab Milo Gay"
 "Angoori"
 "Anokhi"
 "Khushi Ek Roag"
 "Khuda Zameen Se Gaya Nahi Hai"
 "Saiban Sheshay ka"
 "Pathar"
 "Aann"
 "Apnay Huay Paraye"
 "Angels"
 "Inkaar"
 "Tawan" (Pashto)
 "Hum Pe Jo Guzarti Hay"
 Dayar-e-Dil
 "Khwab Saraye" as Abrar Khan

Filmography

See also 
 List of Pakistani actors

References

External links
 

1948 births
2022 deaths
People from Peshawar
Pakistani male television actors
Pakistani male film actors
Pashtun people
Recipients of the Pride of Performance
Pakistani expatriate male actors in India